Mpanga Power Station is an  mini hydroelectric power project located across River Mpanga, in Kitagwenda County, Kitagwenda District in Western Uganda.

Location

Overview
Mpanga Power Station is situated at the location of Mpanga Falls, on Mpanga River. The 18.0 MW power station was developed by Africa Energy Management Systems. Construction began in 2007. The completed power station came online in 2011. A new 33kV transmission line connects the power station to the national electrical grid. , construction of the power station was complete. Technical commissioning was scheduled for Thursday 10 February 2011, while the public commissioning was planned for March 2011. Construction of the power station was undertaken by a Sri Lankan hydropower construction company called VS Hydro (Private) Limited, at an estimated cost of US$26 million.

Mpanga Hydro Power is owned by "EMS Africa" and all the engineering tasks including Operations and Maintenance is done by Sri Lankan Engineers. There are 32 staff (Both Ugandan and Sri Lankan) members currently employed at the site to do the day-to-day operation of the plant.

See also

List of power stations in Uganda
List of hydropower stations in Africa
List of hydroelectric power stations

References

External links
About Mpanga Power Station

Energy infrastructure completed in 2011
Hydroelectric power stations in Uganda
Kamwenge District
Western Region, Uganda